Paul Desmarais III (born ) is a Canadian businessperson and philanthropist.

Early life and education 
Desmarais was educated at Lakefield College School and earned a Bachelor of Science degree in economics from Harvard College and a Master of Business Administration degree from INSEAD.

Career 
After working at Goldman Sachs, Imerys and Great-West Lifeco, Desmarais became Vice-President of Power Corporation of Canada and Power Financial Corporation in 2014. In January 2017, he was named Senior Vice President of both companies. He is Chairman and CEO of Sagard Holdings, Executive Chairman and co-founder of Portag3 Ventures, and Chairman and co-founder of Diagram. Desmarais is involved in financial technology, especially with Portag3, an investment fund. 

In 2019, he was the recipient of the Arnold Edinborough Award (Business / Arts Awards) recognizing his impact on the arts in Canada. In 2000, he was awarded the Duke of Edinburgh's Award (Gold Level).

Personal life 
Paul Desmarais III is the son of Paul Desmarais Jr. and the grandson of Paul Desmarais.

References 

Businesspeople from Montreal
Directors of Power Corporation of Canada
INSEAD alumni
Harvard College alumni
Place of birth missing (living people)
Living people
1980s births
Paul III
Canadian chairpersons of corporations
Canadian corporate directors